Tobias C. Walther is a professor of molecular metabolism at the Harvard School of Public Health, a professor of cell biology at the Harvard Medical School, and an associate member of the Broad Institute of MIT and Harvard. He has been a Howard Hughes Medical Institute investigator since 2015. His primary responsibilities are to provide leadership in research and teaching in the scientific fields of metabolism, membrane biology and lipids. Walther is also the Executive Director of the Harvard Chan School Analytics Center and Director of the Harvard Chan Research Center on Causes and Prevention of Cardiovascular Disease. Before his appointment at Harvard, Walther was an associate professor of cell biology at the Yale School of Medicine.

Walther's laboratory research seeks to understand the mechanisms that regulate lipid metabolism, lipid storage, and lipid function in membranes or as signaling molecules. Walther's research is focused on the mechanisms by which cells regulate their lipid content and the impact of intracellular lipids on cellular functioning.

At Yale, Walther positioned his laboratory at the forefront of the rapidly growing field of lipid droplet biology. His group extensively studied proteins required to adjust lipid droplet size and composition according to the cellular state. Additionally, his research focused on organelle biogenesis and membrane biology. At Yale, Walther also oversaw the High Throughput Cell Biology Center at Yale's West Campus.

At Harvard, Walther is working in a scientific partnership with Robert V. Farese, Jr., on the biochemistry, cell biology, and genetics of lipid metabolism and homeostasis. For their research, Farese and Walther have been using a variety of state-of-the systems biology approaches, such as mass spectrometry-based proteomics and high-content screening.Á

Walther was selected as an American Society for Cell Biology Fellow in 2020.

Education

Walther received his PhD in biology from the European Molecular Biology Laboratory and Ludwig-Maximilians University in Munich in 2002. Walther then joined the Department of Biochemistry and Biophysics at the University of California, San Francisco, to complete his postdoctoral studies. After completion of his postdoctoral training, Walther became group leader at the Max Planck Institute of Biochemistry in Martinsried, Germany. In 2010, Walther relocated his lab from Germany to the United States and was appointed as an associate professor of Cell Biology at the Yale School of Medicine.

References

External links
 HSPH Faculty Page for Tobias C. Walther

Living people
Harvard Medical School faculty
Ludwig Maximilian University of Munich alumni
University of California, San Francisco alumni
Yale School of Medicine faculty
Year of birth missing (living people)
Harvard School of Public Health faculty